Many of the Minnesota Intercollegiate Athletic Conference (MIAC) schools developed club teams over the years, and eventually varsity hockey programs at the Division III level of the NCAA. Most of these varsity teams were established in the late 1990s. After Title IX gave equal access to women's sports, the MIAC, being one of the oldest conferences in the NCAA, finally had enough programs to offer women's ice hockey as a conference starting with the 1998–99 season. Six member programs began play at the time.

History 
In the 1998–99 season, the conference held a postseason tournament named the Augsburg invitational. This served as the first unofficial MIAC Championship.

Four teams qualified, with Gustavus Adolphus defeating Saint Mary's in the championship game. The Gusties would go on to the AWCHA Division III ice hockey championship to play a best-of-three series for the national championship. This was prior to the NCAA sponsoring Division III women's ice hockey.

In the 1999–00 season, the official MIAC women's ice hockey tournament was established to determine the postseason conference champion. With two more schools joining the MIAC, the top four teams qualified, with the higher seed hosting a two-game aggregate and the winner advancing to the aforementioned AWCHA Division III ice hockey championship.

In the 2001–02 season, the NCAA established a Division III Women's Ice Hockey Championship, of which the MIAC tournament champion received an automatic bid. The MIAC, now at ten teams, added a fifth team to their conference tournament.  The new play-in game featured the 4th place team hosting the 5th place team, with the winner playing the #1 seed. The conference also eliminated the two-game aggregate model, moving towards a more traditional single-elimination style tournament.  In the 2002 tournament, the semifinals and championship were held at a neutral site. The next season, in 2003, the entire tournament was held at a neutral site. From that point on, the MIAC tournament went back to the higher seed hosting through all rounds. This format stayed the same for years, with the only temporary adjustments coming because of the COVID-19 pandemic.  After the 2020-21 tournament was cancelled due to the pandemic, the 2021-22 tournament was modified so that all ten teams qualified for the conference tournament. This was done so to allow all players the chance to play additional games after a few COVID cancellations bled into the 2021–22 season. This gave the top six teams in the standings a bye in a traditional ten-team bracket with no reseeding.

In the 2022-23 season, it was announced that the women's tournament would return to the traditional five-team field.

2000

Note: * denotes overtime period(s)

2001

Note: * denotes overtime period(s)

2002

Note: * denotes overtime period(s)

2003

Note: * denotes overtime period(s)

2004

Note: * denotes overtime period(s)

2005

Note: * denotes overtime period(s)

2006

Note: * denotes overtime period(s)

2007

Note: * denotes overtime period(s)

2008

Note: * denotes overtime period(s)

2009

Note: * denotes overtime period(s)

2010

Note: * denotes overtime period(s)

2011

Note: * denotes overtime period(s)

2012

Note: * denotes overtime period(s)

2013

Note: * denotes overtime period(s)

2014

Note: * denotes overtime period(s)

2015

Note: * denotes overtime period(s)

2016

Note: * denotes overtime period(s)

2017

Note: * denotes overtime period(s)

2018

Note: * denotes overtime period(s), St. Thomas finished 2nd, ineligible for conference playoffs

2019

Note: * denotes overtime period(s)

2020

Note: * denotes overtime period(s)

2021

Cancelled due to COVID-19 pandemic

2022 

Note: * denotes overtime period(s)

2023

Note: * denotes overtime period(s)

Championships by school

References 

Ice hockey competitions in the United States